Matt Baker (1955 – 2017) was an American Quarter Horse trainer and jockey.

Early life
Maddox "Matt" Lafayette Baker was born on March 26, 1955, in Columbus, Georgia and died on February 7, 2017. He grew up in Texas, graduating from Deer Park High School in 1974. As a teenager he was a jockey in east Texas and began his training career shortly thereafter.

Racing career
Based in Louisiana and Texas, from 1974 to 2007 Baker saddled 4,088 horses, compiling a record of 790 wins, including 17 stakes victories in Texas and Louisiana. His top earner was First Down Toro, who won the 2006 LQHBA Breeders Futurity at Evangeline Downs. He won the 2000 TQHA Sale Futurity with Cash To the Front and had multiple stakes wins with Prince of Strides, Jack Zee Quick, Strider Man and Mr Bar Code.

Other notable racehorses trained by Baker include past AQHA Champions Johnny Vittoro, and Shining Sky.

Awards
In 2005, Baker was awarded the Texas Department of Public Safety's Director's Award after rescuing a toddler from a submerging car that had driven off the road and into a pond on his ranch.

 Multiple Graded Stakes winning trainer
 1981 Leading Trainer, Delta Downs
 "Million-Dollar Trainer" Speedhorse Magazine

Posthumous Honors 
Matt Baker Memorial Race at Delta Downs

 May 12, 2017
 Winner: Strong Guns, owned by Lester Colomb, Jr., trained by Kenneth Weeks, and ridden by Damian Martinez.
 May 26, 2018
 Winner: Dashing Padre, owned by Rodney Verret, trained by Kenneth Roberts, Sr., and ridden by Noe Castaneda.
 May 18, 2019
 Winner: TBD

References

1955 births
2017 deaths
People from Columbus, Georgia
American Quarter Horse trainers
American jockeys